Project X is a 1987 science fiction comedy-drama film produced by Walter F. Parkes and Lawrence Lasker, directed by Jonathan Kaplan, and starring Matthew Broderick and Helen Hunt. The plot revolves around a USAF Airman (Broderick) and a graduate student (Hunt) who are assigned to care for chimpanzees used in a secret Air Force project.

Plot
University of Wisconsin graduate student Teri MacDonald (Helen Hunt) has trained a chimpanzee named Virgil (Willie) to use sign language. When her National Science Foundation research grant is not renewed, she is forced to sell Virgil. He is taken to an Air Force base in Lockridge, Florida, to be used in a top-secret research project involving flight simulation, though she's told that he's been sent to the Houston Zoo.

Airman Jimmy Garrett (Matthew Broderick) is assigned to the same chimpanzee project. Virgil and Jimmy quickly bond, and Jimmy discovers that Virgil has been taught sign language. Unbeknownst to Jimmy, once the chimpanzees reach a certain level in operating the flight simulator, they will be exposed to a lethal pulse of radiation to determine how long a pilot may survive after a nuclear exchange in carrying out a second-strike.

When Jimmy becomes aware of the chimpanzees' fate, he contacts Teri, who comes to the base. Teri tells Jimmy that she will inform the NSF of the deception, but Jimmy explains that she does not have enough time because Virgil is scheduled to die soon.

Jimmy challenges Dr. Carroll (William Sadler) and others about the project's value by noting that the hypothetical pilot, knowing the implications of the second-strike scenario, would know that he is dying, and would, therefore, be affected by that knowledge. However, the chimpanzees would not be as aware; thus, the project is flawed. Enraged, Dr. Carroll promises Jimmy that his military career is finished.

Meanwhile, in the vivarium, some of the chimpanzees have unlocked their cages and have stacked crates and boxes to attempt an escape through a skylight. Jimmy, Teri, Dr. Carroll and the authorities walk in the vivarium to see the chimpanzees loose. Virgil is at the top of the stack and attempts to break the skylight with a crowbar. Teri sees Virgil up top and convinces him to come down. Dr. Carroll attempts to control the chimpanzees with an electric prod, but Goliath the chimpanzee proves too powerful, prompting Dr. Carroll and the authorities to flee. Many chimpanzees escape the vivarium and cause havoc throughout the base, while Goliath and two other chimpanzees Winston and Spike reach the flight chamber. Inside, Goliath and the two chimpanzees wreck the simulator and short the reactor’s control panel, causing the radiation reactor to go up. Jimmy, Teri and Virgil arrive and see the chimpanzees continue to wreck the flight chamber.  Jimmy gets Winston and Spike out and barely escapes, however, Goliath’s refusal to leave despite Jimmy’s pleas traps him in the flight chamber just as the reactor’s control panel short-circuits and generates a radiation blast. A fire extinguisher left by the chimps jams the reactor on its way down, posing a risk of a possible meltdown. Jimmy and Virgil convince Goliath to yank out the jammed fire extinguisher and succeeds, but Goliath later dies from radiation exposure.

Jimmy and Teri steal a military plane to help the chimpanzees escape, but military police stop them. While the police are holding them, Virgil pilots the plane, and the chimps fly away. They eventually crash in the nearby Everglades and evade a search. Just as the search is being abandoned, Jimmy and Teri see Virgil hiding in the bush with his chimpanzee girlfriend Ginger. Teri signs to Virgil that he and the others are now "free", and the chimpanzees disappear into the Everglades.

Cast

 Matthew Broderick as Jimmy Garrett
 Helen Hunt as Teri MacDonald
 William Sadler as Dr. Carroll (credited as Bill Sadler)
 Johnny Ray McGhee as Robertson
 Jonathan Stark as Sgt. Krieger
 Robin Gammell as Col. Niles
 Stephen Lang as Watts
 Jean Smart as Dr. Criswell
 Daniel Roebuck as Hadfield
 Marvin J. McIntyre as Cellmate
 Harry Northup as Congressman
 Michael Eric Kramer as Lt. Voeks
 Dick Miller as Max King
 Jules Sylvester as Airman
 Richard Cummings Jr. as Lt. Hayes
 Robert Lee Minor as Air Policeman
 Ken Lerner as Finley
 Michael McGrady as Wilson
 Deborah Offner as Carol Lee
 Lance E. Nichols as Hamer
 Ken Sagoes as Patrolman
 Richard Paul as Lead Ape

Production 
Lawrence Lasker began pre-production of the film at Warner Bros. Pictures with John Badham directing, but switched to 20th Century Fox after Warner Bros insisted on using small actors in chimpanzee suits instead of real chimpanzees. The film was shot in Los Angeles and at Camarillo Airport and at Van Nuys Airport.

Reception

Critical reception
The movie received generally positive reviews from critics. , it holds a 75% approval rating on Rotten Tomatoes, based on 20 reviews with an average rating of 6.1/10.

In his review for The New York Times, Walter Goodman described the film as a "young folks' story, a sweet-natured boy-and-his-chimp tale (even the bad guys aren't all that bad - that's very arguable), with a dose of Animal Liberation to give the impression that something of current significance is going on."

On 5 February 1989, it was the first film ever shown on Sky Movies in the United Kingdom and Ireland.

Controversy
TV personality Bob Barker and the United Activists for Animal Rights accused the film's producers of animal cruelty. The American Humane Association, which consulted during production, filed a $10 million defamation lawsuit, arguing that the animal cruelty claims were based on hearsay. In 1994, over Barker's objections, his insurance company settled the lawsuit for $300,000.

Aftermath
Virgil was portrayed by "Willie", who now resides at Primarily Primates wildlife refuge. Willie was sent there along with Harry, who played his "girlfriend". They were retired from the entertainment industry and live with other males in a tightly knit group at the refuge in Bexar County, Texas.

References

External links

 
 
 
 
 
 

1987 films
American science fiction comedy-drama films
1980s science fiction comedy-drama films
American science fiction thriller films
1980s science fiction thriller films
American comedy thriller films
Films about apes
Films about the United States Air Force
American Sign Language films
Films directed by Jonathan Kaplan
20th Century Fox films
Films scored by James Horner
Films about animal rights
Animal cruelty incidents in film
1980s comedy thriller films
Films produced by Walter F. Parkes
Films set in Madison, Wisconsin
Films set in Florida
Films shot in Ventura County, California
Films shot in Los Angeles County, California
Films shot in Los Angeles
1980s American films